Eucalyptus miniata, commonly known as the Darwin woollybutt or woolewoorrng, is a species of medium-sized to tall tree that is endemic to northern Australia. It has rough, fibrous, brownish bark on the trunk, smooth greyish bark above. Adult leaves are lance-shaped, the flower buds are ribbed and arranged in groups of seven, the flowers orange or scarlet and the fruit is cylindrical to barrel-shaped or urn-shaped, with ribs along the sides.

Description
The bark is soft, rough, fibrous and fissured, grey to red-yellow-brown in colour on the trunk with white to pale grey smooth bark on the upper trunk and branches.

Taxonomy and naming
The species was first formally described by the botanist Johannes Conrad Schauer in 1843 in Wilhelm Gerhard Walpers work Repertorium Botanices Systematicae from an unpublished description by Allan Cunningham. The species name miniata is Latin meaning flame-scarlet referring to the colour of the filaments of the flowers. The Miriwoong people of the Kimberley call the tree woolewoorrng.

Distribution and habitat
Eucalyptus miniata is commonly found in open forest, savanna communities and on sandstone escarpments, growing in sandy soils. It is widely distributed from the Kimberley region in Western Australia and through northern parts of the Northern Territory to the Burketown region of far northwestern Queensland. It occurs in the Arnhem Coast, Arnhem Plateau, Central Kimberley, Daly Basin, Darwin Coastal, Einasleigh Uplands, Gulf Coastal, Gulf Fall and Uplands, Gulf Plains, Northern Kimberley, Ord Victoria Plain, Pine Creek, Tiwi Cobourg, and Victoria Bonaparte bioregions.

Ecology
Red-tailed black cockatoos living in the north of Australia prefer feeding on the Darwin woollybutt.

Conservation status
Eucalyptus miniata is classified as "not threatened" in Western Australia by the Western Australian Government Department of Parks and Wildlife.

See also
List of Eucalyptus species

References

Myrtales of Australia
miniata
Trees of Australia
Eucalypts of Western Australia
Flora of the Northern Territory
Flora of Queensland
Plants described in 1843